Edward Black (May 30, 1853 – June 30, 1872) was a drummer boy for the Union during the American Civil War. At twelve years old, his left hand and arm were shattered by an exploding shell. He is considered to be the youngest wounded soldier of the war.

Early life
A resident of Indianapolis, Indiana the son of George A. Black [b.1830] and Lydia A. [b.1832]. In the 1860 United States census he is listed as Edward Black, age 6, with a brother, Charles Black, age 9.

U.S. military service
Enlisted July 24, 1861 as a Musician in Company L of the 21st Indiana Infantry regiment; discharged August 16, 1862.

Death
In the 1870 United States census he is listed with his parents (George and Lydia) as age 17, birth state of Indiana, residence Indianapolis. He died June 30, 1872, and is buried Crown Hill Cemetery, Indianapolis, Indiana.

Notes

References

Child soldiers in the American Civil War

1853 births
1872 deaths
Union Army soldiers